Queen's Covers (TC: 聽后感) is a Mandopop album by Edmond Leung, who has been active since 1990, which is his 2nd studio album in Mandarin.

Track listing
Step By Step (一步步)
You Exist In My Song (我的歌聲裡)
Bravery (勇氣)
I'm Not Sad (我不難過)
Conquer (征服)
Better Halves  (半邊生命)

Music awards

References

Edmond Leung albums
2014 albums
Mandarin-language albums